Peter Schreier (29 July 1935 – 25 December 2019) was a German tenor in opera, concert and lied, and a conductor. He was regarded as one of the leading lyric tenors of the 20th century.

Schreier was a member of the Dresdner Kreuzchor conducted by Rudolf Mauersberger, performing as an alto soloist. He became a tenor, focused on concert and lieder singing, well known internationally for the Evangelist parts in Bach's Christmas Oratorio and Passion. A member of the Berlin State Opera from 1963, he appeared in Mozart roles such as Belmonte in Die Entführung aus dem Serail and Tamino in Die Zauberflöte, and in the title role of Pfitzner's Palestrina, among others. He appeared at the Vienna State Opera and the Metropolitan Opera, among others, as one of few singers from the German Democratic Republic to perform internationally.

Schreier made many recordings, especially of Bach's works as both a singer and a conductor, even simultaneously. He recorded many lieder including the song cycles by Schubert and Schumann. He was known for intelligent understanding of texts and their musical expression with intensity. Schreier received awards including the Ernst von Siemens Music Prize, Léonie Sonning Music Prize.

Early life 
In June 1945, when Schreier was almost ten years old, and just a few months after the destruction of Dresden, he entered the boarding school of the Dresdner Kreuzchor boys' choir. Its conductor Rudolf Mauersberger recognized his talent. He let him sing many solo alto parts and created compositions with his voice in mind. Solo recordings from the time (1948–1951) were reissued on compact disc.

Schreier was 16 years old when his voice broke, and he became a tenor, as he had passionately wished, because of the several Evangelists – all tenors – in J.S. Bach's Passions and in his Christmas Oratorio. After he had decided to become a professional singer he took voice lessons, privately from 1954 to 1956, then at the Musikhochschule Dresden, where he also studied conducting.

Career 
Peter Schreier made his professional debut at the Dresdner Staatsoper in 1957, as the First Prisoner in Beethoven's Fidelio. His breakthrough came in 1962 as Belmonte in Mozart's Die Entführung aus dem Serail, and he also appeared as Tamino in The Magic Flute. In 1963, he became a member of the Berlin State Opera. Starting in 1966, he was for many years an annual guest of the Vienna State Opera. That same year he made his debut at the Bayreuth Festival as the young seaman in Tristan und Isolde with Karl Böhm as conductor. For 25 years, beginning in 1967, he took part in the program of the annual Salzburg Festival. In 1969, he starred as The Witch in Engelbert Humperdinck's Hansel and Gretel, in a CD recording that featured the Staatskapelle Dresden. He performed more than 60 operatic roles. It was important to him to sing the title role of Palestrina, the opera by Hans Pfitzner, not only in Munich but also in East Berlin — a controversial issue at the time in East Germany.

Schreier was one of few singers from the German Democratic Republic to perform internationally, including at the Metropolitan Opera. He appeared regularly at the Vienna State Opera, where he sang 200 performances, beginning as Tamino in 1967, also as Belmonte, Don Ottavio in Mozart's Don Giovanni, the title role of Idomeneo, Flamand in Capriccio by Richard Strauss, Lenski in Tchaikovsky's Eugen Onegin, Count Almaviva in Rossini's Il barbiere di Siviglia and Loge in Wagner's Das Rheingold. His Wagner roles also included Mime in Siegfried.

He recorded Bach cantatas regularly with the Thomanerchor and the Gewandhaus Orchestra conducted by Erhard Mauersberger, with soloists including Adele Stolte, Annelies Burmeister and Theo Adam, such as the cantata for Pentecost Erschallet, ihr Lieder, erklinget, ihr Saiten! BWV 172, in 1970. He was the Evangelist in Bach's St Matthew Passion in recordings conducted by both Rudolf and Erhard Mauersberger, Karl Richter, Claudio Abbado and Herbert von Karajan. He recorded Bach's St John Passion and Christmas Oratorio with Helmuth Rilling.

In June 2000, Schreier left the opera stage. His last role at the Berlin State Opera was Tamino; he argued that he could no longer pretend to be a young prince. He ended his singing career on 22 December 2005, combining the functions of Evangelist and conductor in a performance of Bach's Christmas Oratorio in Prague. He kept singing lieder, a genre he had pursued throughout his career, including the song cycles by Schubert and Schumann.

From the early 1970s, Schreier was also a conductor with a special interest in the works of Mozart, Bach, and Haydn. He conducted orchestras such as the Vienna Philharmonic and the New York Philharmonic.

Personal life 
Schreier was married and lived in Dresden from 1945 until his death, in the district of Loschwitz. He died in Dresden on Christmas Day, 25 December 2019, after a long illness.
He was survived by his wife, Renate, and two sons, Torsten and Ralf.
The funeral service took place at the Kreuzkirche, Dresden on 8 January 2020.

Evaluation 
Schreier was an extremely intelligent singer, with sympathetic feeling for the text. 
Monika Grütters, Federal Government Commissioner for Culture and the Media, summarised after his death that he was one of the most impressive voices from Germany (""), who represented Germany in the opera houses of the world as a nation of culture (""), remembered as the Evangelist in Bach's Passions, and having written music history in a career of four decades.

Honours and awards 
 Kammersänger (title conferred to singers of outstanding merit) by the governments of the GDR, Austria and Bavaria, 1963, 1980, 1982
 National First Class Prize of the GDR, 1967
 Robert Schumann Prize of the City of Zwickau, 1969
 Handel Prize of the City of Halle, 1972
 National Prize of the GDR, 1972
 Gold Vaterländischer Verdienstorden, 1984[5]
 Ernst von Siemens Music Prize, 1988
 Léonie Sonning Music Prize, Denmark, 1988
 Honorary membership of the Musikverein Wien (Vienna Society of Music), 1986
 Star of People's Friendship, 1989
 Member of the Royal Swedish Academy of Music, 1989
 Bundesverdienstkreuz I. Klasse (Order of Merit of the Federal Republic of Germany), 1993
 Member of the Academy of Arts, Berlin, 1993
 Wiener Flötenuhr, 1994
 Georg Philipp Telemann Prize of the city of Magdeburg, 1994
 German Bible Prize, for service in the great Passions and Interpretation of the work of J.S. Bach, 1998
 European Church Music Prize, 2000
 Honorary citizen of the city of Meissen for efforts in fundraising for the city's restoration
 Royal Academy of Music/Kohn Foundation Bach Prize, 2009
 Hugo Wolf Medal, Hugo Wolf Academy, Stuttgart, 2011
 International Mendelssohn Prize of the Felix Mendelssohn Bartholdy Foundation, Leipzig, 2011
 Bach Medal, Bach Festival Leipzig, for interpretation of Bach, 2013
 Sächsischer Verdienstorden, 2016
 Kunstpreis der Landeshauptstadt Dresden, 2016

Discography 
The German National Library holds recordings by Schreier, including:

As singer 
 80th Anniversary Edition, Berlin Classics (Edel) 2015
 Johann Sebastian Bach:
 Matthäus-Passion (Evangelist and arias), conducted by Karl Richter, Archiv Produktion (Universal Music) 1989
 Johannes-Passion, conducted by Hans-Joachim Rotzsch, RCA Classic (Sony Music) 1998
 Weihnachtsoratorium, conducted by Martin Flämig, Dresdner Philharmonie, Dresdner Kreuzchor, Lukaskirche 1974
 Ludwig van Beethoven: An die ferne Geliebte, with András Schiff, piano, Decca (Universal Music) 1996
 Hector Berlioz: Requiem, conducted by Charles Munch, Deutsche Grammophon (Universal Music) 2009
 Johannes Brahms: Die schöne Magelone, with András Schiff, Belvedere (Harmonia Mundi) 2015
 Wolfgang Amadeus Mozart:
 Opera Arias, Polygram Records 1990
 Die Zauberflote (Tamino), conducted by Wolfgang Sawallisch, EMI (Warner Classics) 1987
 Der Odem der Liebe. Peter Schreier als Mozart-Tenor, conducted by Otmar Suitner, Eterna 1973
 Prokofjew – Hindemith: Lieder, Berlin Classics (Edel) 2004
 Franz Schubert:
 Die schöne Müllerin (with Konrad Ragossnig, guitar), Berlin Classics (Edel) 2004
 Die Winterreise (setting for voice and string quartet), Profil (Naxos) 2015
 Schubert Songs, with András Schiff, Wigmore Hall Live (CODAEX Deutschland) 2006
 Heinrich Schütz: Johannes-Passion SWV 481 / Psalmen Davids, conducted by Martin Flämig, Berlin classics (Edel) 1997
 Robert Schumann:
 Dichterliebe, with Christoph Eschenbach, Teldec Classics International GmbH 1991
 Dichterliebe / Liederkreis, with Norman Shetler, Berlin Classics (Edel) 2007
 Vom Knabenalt zum lyrischen Tenor, Berlin Classics (Edel) 1995
 Richard Wagner: Tristan und Isolde (Melot), conducted by Herbert von Karajan, EMI – His Masters Voice, 1988
 Hugo Wolf:
 Goethe-Lieder, with Wolfgang Sawallisch, Ariola Eurodisc 1986
 Mörike-Lieder, with Karl Engel, Orfeo (Naxos Deutschland) 1998

As conductor 
 Johann Sebastian Bach:
 Weihnachtsoratorium,  (selections) Staatskapelle Dresden. MC, Eterna-Digital, 1985
 Johannes-Passion, Staatskapelle Dresden, Newton Classics (Membran), 2011
 Zwei Hochzeitskantaten, Weichet nur, betrübte Schatten, BWV 202 / O holder Tag, erwünschte Zeit, BWV 210), the Kammerorchester Berlin, Brilliant Classics (c. 2000)
 Weltliche Kantaten, Was mit behagt, ist nur die muntre Jagd, BWV 208 / Ich bin in mir vergnügt, BWV 204, Brilliant Classics (c. 2000)
 Matthäus-Passion, Rundfunkchor Leipzig, Staatskapelle Dresden, VEB Schallplatten, Berlin/GDR, 1984
 Messe h-Moll, Rundfunkchor Leipzig, Staatskapelle Dresden, Philips Classics Production, 1992
Wolfgang Amadeus Mozart:
 Requiem, Margaret Price, Trudeliese Schmidt, Francisco Araiza, Theo Adam; Rundfunkchor Leipzig & Staatskapelle Dresden, Philips, 1983

Documentary films 
 Peter Schreier – Alles hat seine Zeit. 83 Min., directed and produced by Heide Blum. D 2006.

Literature 
 Gottfried Schmiedel: Peter Schreier für Sie porträtiert. VEB Deutscher Verlag für Musik Leipzig, Leipzig 1976 
 Peter Schreier: Aus meiner Sicht. Gedanken und Erinnerungen, Ostberlin 1983, 207 pages. 
 
 Jürgen Helfricht: Peter Schreier – Melodien eines Lebens. Verlag der Kunst Dresden, Husum 2008, 
 Renate Rätz: Schreier, Peter. In: Wer war wer in der DDR? 5. Ausgabe. Vol. 2, Ch. Links, Berlin 2010, .
 Manfred Meier, Peter Schreier: Im Rückspiegel : Erinnerungen und Ansichten, recorded by Manfred Meier, Wien: Steinbauer 2005, .

References

External links 

 
 
 Peter Schreier (Tenor, Conductor) Bach Cantatas Website
 Alles hat seine Zeit (documentary) heide-blum.de2006
 Tenor / Conductor Peter  Schreier / A Conversation with Bruce Duffie bruceduffie.com 10 March 1997
 

1935 births
2019 deaths
German male conductors (music)
German operatic tenors
People educated at the Kreuzschule
Österreichischer Kammersänger
Bach musicians
Honorary Members of the Royal Academy of Music
Officers Crosses of the Order of Merit of the Federal Republic of Germany
Recipients of the Order of Merit of the Free State of Saxony
Recipients of the Léonie Sonning Music Prize
Handel Prize winners
Winners of the Royal Academy of Music/ Kohn Foundation Bach Prize
Members of the Academy of Arts, Berlin
Ernst von Siemens Music Prize winners
Recipients of the National Prize of East Germany
21st-century German conductors (music)
20th-century German  male opera singers
20th-century German conductors (music)
Bach singers
Lieder singers